Sherburn High School is a coeducational secondary school and sixth form located in Sherburn in Elmet in Selby, North Yorkshire, England. It has around 950 pupils aged 11 to 18 years. The current head teacher is Miriam Oakley.

The school was awarded specialist Science College status in the summer of 2005 and has been recognised by the National Healthy Schools Programme for the quality of physical education and school dinners.

The school does not have a gymnasium from July 2018 onwards due to a fire. The BBC reported that what they described as a "teenager girl" had been arrested in connection with the incident.

Previously a community school administered by North Yorkshire County Council, in October 2019 Sherburn High School converted to academy status. The school is now sponsored by The STAR Multi Academy Trust.

References

Educational institutions with year of establishment missing
Secondary schools in North Yorkshire
Academies in North Yorkshire
Sherburn in Elmet